Dimitar Vodenicharov (born 26 December 1987 in Blagoevgrad) is a Bulgarian football striker.

Career
Vodenicharov is a forward who was born in Blagoevgrad, but made his debut in professional football while being part of the Slavia Sofia's squad during the 2004-05 season. On 15 January 2008, he was loaned out to Spartak Varna. On 16 January 2010, he returned to his home town and signed a contract with Pirin Blagoevgrad. In 2014, he is playing in the Macedonian First League for football team Pelister, and is one of the best ones in the crew.

References

External links
 

1987 births
Living people
Sportspeople from Blagoevgrad
Bulgarian footballers
Association football forwards
First Professional Football League (Bulgaria) players
Second Professional Football League (Bulgaria) players
PFC Slavia Sofia players
PFC Spartak Varna players
OFC Pirin Blagoevgrad players
FC Montana players
FC Lyubimets players
FK Pelister players
FC Vitosha Bistritsa players
FC Septemvri Sofia players
Bulgarian expatriate footballers
Expatriate footballers in North Macedonia
Bulgarian expatriate sportspeople in North Macedonia